Picross 3D: Round 2 known in Japan as  is a Japanese puzzle video game developed by HAL Laboratory for the Nintendo 3DS. It is the sequel to the 2009 Nintendo DS game, Picross 3D. The game was released in Japan on October 1, 2015, in North America on September 1, 2016, in Europe on December 2, 2016, and in Australia on December 3, 2016. In North America, it was only released as a digital download.

Gameplay

Picross 3D: Round 2 features gameplay similar to that of its predecessor, Picross 3D, in which the rules of Picross are applied to three-dimensional puzzles. Three difficulty levels can be chosen for each puzzle, which are easy, medium, and hard. In each puzzle, players must analyze the numbers featured on rows and columns and either paint or break away specific blocks to reveal a 3D model of an object or character. This time around, each puzzle possesses two kinds of colored blocks that must be painted accordingly; blue blocks, which represent straight square blocks, and orange blocks, which transform into curved or cut-out blocks when filled in. This introduces dual numbers, indicating rows or columns containing both blue and orange blocks. Players are penalised for destroying blocks incorrectly or painting a block the wrong color. Players can use flags to highlight potential blocks in certain colors if they are unsure, and can use bombs to quickly clear rows and columns containing no blocks. Players can also unlock up to nine additional Nintendo-themed puzzles by scanning in compatible amiibo figures.

Besides an addition of over 370 puzzles, it also features colour variations for the remaining of the blocks.

Reception

Picross 3D: Round 2 received "generally favorable reviews" according to the review aggregator Metacritic. Nintendo Life gave the game 9 stars out of 10 and called it a "gem".

See also
Picross 3D, the predecessor to Picross 3D: Round 2 on the Nintendo DS.
Picross e, a Picross game series made by Nintendo and Jupiter for the Nintendo 3DS.

References

External links

2015 video games
HAL Laboratory games
Nintendo 3DS games
Nintendo 3DS eShop games
Nintendo 3DS-only games
Nonograms
Picross (video game series)
Puzzle video games
Video games developed in Japan
Video games that use Amiibo figurines
Single-player video games